Červonka, also known as Vecsaliena, is a settlement in Vecsaliena Parish, Augšdaugava Municipality in the Selonia region of Latvia. The village is known for its manor house.

References

External links 
 Satellite map at Maplandia.com

Towns and villages in Latvia
Augšdaugava Municipality
Selonia